Moscow High School (MHS) is a four-year public high school in Moscow, Idaho, United States. The flagship school of the Moscow School District serves grades 9–12. Since 2013, Erik Perryman has served as principal with Brett Clevenger serving as vice. The school's second vice principal, Lance Abendroth, passed away in 2022. MHS colors are red, black, and white, and the mascot is a bear.

Campus
Less than three blocks east of Main Street on a moderate slope, its current compact campus opened  in 1939, with wings added in 1968 and 1991. The previous high school of 1912 is across Third Street to the north; it was used as the junior high until 1959 and is now the "1912 Center." The original high school of 1892 was on the site of the present north wing; it was later Whitworth grade school and was razed in 1939.

Originally a four-year high school, MHS was a senior high school (grades 10–12) for 46 years, beginning in 1966. The school district reconfigured in 2012 and Moscow High returned to a four-year school in August with the addition of the freshman class. A summer asbestos removal project was initiated in 2014 and extended into the school year due to delays.

An attempt to fund a new campus on the northeast edge of the city was defeated by voters  in 2005. The levy needed a two-thirds majority to pass and was defeated with only 44% in favor.

Due to its location among the oldest part of the town, the school's grounds became the location of an archeological dig orchestrated by the University of Idaho's Department of Sociology and Anthropology in the Autumn of 2019.

Athletics
Moscow's athletic teams compete in IHSAA Class 4A, the second-highest in the state, in the Inland Empire League (4A).
MHS competed against the largest schools in Idaho in Class A-1 (now 5A) until the fall of 1979. It was dropped a classification level in 1976, but successfully appealed for three years to stay. Moscow opted not to petition in 1979 and went down to  A-2 (now 3A), and moved between A-2 and A-1 (Div. II) until the new IHSAA classification system placed them in 4A in 2001.

Baseball
Moscow's most successful run in athletics came in baseball under longtime head coach Gary Johnson. In an eight-season stretch from 1978 through 1985, the Bears were in seven state title games and won five, including three consecutive (1982–84).

Basketball
The early MHS basketball team won four straight Idaho titles (1917–20), and more recently, the girls' basketball team won three consecutive A-2 state championships (1992–94) and another in 1996 for four in five years. The boys team  was an A2 state champion in 1980 finishing the season with a losing record. In the 1983–1984 season, the state of Idaho was the "test state" for the 3-point line for the entire nation for high schoolers. That season there was tremendous excitement which  attracted large crowds to the games. That same year an unusual requirement from the state was created as there were only two teams in the league at that time; Moscow and Orofino. The state required the two teams to play a "Best of 3" series. Moscow won the Best of 3 district championship after losing both league games during the season. That team then had to play a "regional championship" at a neutral site. The Bears were an A-2 state finalist in 1996 and state champion again in 1997, winning their last twenty games.

Volleyball
The volleyball team was undefeated (29–0) in the fall of 2005 to claim their only state title. In 1999, the boys' soccer team went 16-5-1 and won the state title, defeating Boise High 1–0 in overtime.

Football
Moscow's football program was strong in Class A-1 in the late 1960s and early 1970s; the 1968 Bears were undefeated at 9–0. The 1968 and 1969 teams both finished second in the state writers' polls to undefeated Borah of Boise. Moscow went 9–1 in 1971 and was fourth in the final poll, 9–0 in 1975 and again polled fourth. After the move down to A-2 in 1979 and the addition of playoffs, the Bears won state titles in 1981 and 1992.

Mascot
Exactly when the bear became the school mascot is not well documented, but the Lewiston Morning Tribune referred to the MHS basketball team as the "Bears" in early 1927. Alumnus and head coach Lyle Smith obtained a live bear cub for a mascot in 1941. The present school colors were noted in 1936, and likely date back decades further.

Facilities

Due to limited space on its  campus, the varsity athletic facilities are located approximately a mile (1.6 km) northeast at Bear Field (and Bear Den gym), adjacent to Moscow Middle School and the school district headquarters.  In 1976 and 1979, Moscow played its home football games across town at the Kibbie Dome on the University of Idaho campus, and again in 1996, when the running track at Bear Field was being replaced. Opened  in early 1966, the Bear Den was originally known as the fieldhouse.

State playoff and championship football games in all classifications are regularly held in the Kibbie Dome.

Rivals
Moscow's oldest rivalries are with Pullman, Lewiston, and Coeur d'Alene.

A longtime member of the Inland Empire League of north Idaho, MHS currently competes with Lakeland and Sandpoint in the IEL's 4A division. (The IEL's 5A division has four teams: Lewiston, Coeur d'Alene, Lake City, and Post Falls.)

State titles

Boys
 Football (2): fall (A-2, now 3A) 1981, 1992   (official with introduction of playoffs, fall 1979 (A-1) 1978 (A-2))
 Soccer (1): fall (A-1, now 5A) 1999
 Basketball (10): (one class) 1917, 1918, 1919, 1920, 1923, 1933, 1934; (A-1, now 5A) 1972, (A-2, now 3A) 1980, 1997
 Baseball (5): (A-1, now 5A) 1978, (A-2, now 3A) 1980, 1982, 1983, 1984   (baseball records not kept by IHSAA, A-1 tourney started in 1971, A-2 in 1980)
 Track (1): (4A) 2008; also four co-titles (north): 1939–42
 Golf (2): (B, now 3A) 1997, (4A) 2009

Girls
 Volleyball (1): fall (4A) 2005
 Basketball (6): (A-2, now 3A) 1981, 1982, 1992, 1993, 1994, 1996
 Track (2): (A-2, now 3A) 1992, (4A) 2006
 Golf (2): (4A) 2010, 2011

Club activities 

 The Model United Nations Club annually attends the Model United Nations conference in Seattle, Washington. Club members represent organizations from different nations worldwide.
Human Rights and International club participates in discussions and events to work for equality and human rights in the community, nationally, and internationally
Business Professionals of America at Moscow High School runs the student store and participates in the national BPA competition
Chess Club teaches students the finer arts of Chess
Environmental Club goes on a yearly "Turtle Trip" to a beach near Tomatlán, Mexico, to assist in the conservation of Olive ridley sea turtles.
Ping Pong club learns how to play Ping Pong and competes against other members of the club
 Knowledge Bowl and Science Bowl clubs participate in timed regional competitions in which teams attempt to answer questions before their opponents.

Other Clubs:
Buddy Club
Gender Sexuality Alliance
Encore
MHS Games
Bike Club
PERIOD Club
Environmental Club
Rock Band Club
Swing Dance Club

Notable alumni

 Shay Hatten - screenwriter noted for John Wick: Chapter 3, Army of Thieves, and other films Class of 2012
 Hec Edmundson – college basketball and track head coach at Idaho and Washington, state's first Olympian (track: 800 m, 1912), Class of 1906 (UI Prep)
 Julia Gaines, percussionist, Class of 1987
 Guy Wicks – college basketball and baseball head coach at Idaho, Class of 1920 
 Lyle Smith – football head coach and athletic director at Boise State, Class of 1934
 Kim Goetz – college basketball player, Class of 1975
 Dan Monson – college basketball head coach, Class of 1980
 Andrea Lloyd-Curry – professional basketball player, Women's Basketball Hall of Fame (inducted 2007), won gold at 1988 Olympics, Class of 1983
 Doug Riesenberg – NFL lineman, Super Bowl champion, Class of 1983
 Megan Griffiths – filmmaker, Class of 1993
 Josh Ritter – critically acclaimed singer/songwriter, Class of 1995
 Samuel D. Hunter – playwright, Class of 2000
 James George – Emmy-award winning artist and entrepreneur, Class of 2004

References

External links

 
 Moscow School District #281
 Max Preps sports   Moscow High School
 Postcard of MHS (1892) – 1909 drawing
 Postcard of MHS (1939) – 1943 photograph
 Web-cam – southwest view from MHS, University of Idaho in  distance
 Web-cam – MHS athletic facilities at MJHS campus; Palouse Range & Moscow Mountain in distance
 University of Idaho Library – vintage images of Moscow High School
 YouTube video: Moscow High Pride Lip Dub – April 2012

Public high schools in Idaho
Moscow, Idaho
Schools in Latah County, Idaho
1892 establishments in Idaho
Educational institutions established in 1892